Marisela del Carmen Santibáñez Novoa (born 24 April 1975) is a Chilean actress, presenter, and politician of the Communist Party (PCCh). She has been a member of the Chamber of Deputies for District 14 since March 2018.

Biography
Marisela Santibáñez was born in Santiago on 24 April 1975, the younger of two daughters of Rosario Novoa Benavente and Ricardo Fernando Santibáñez Moya.

In 2003, she gave birth to a daughter, who died from leukemia in June 2011.

Media career
Santibáñez studied theater under the guidance of Patricio Achurra, as well as social communication. In 2000, she starred in an advertisement for the Tapsin brand that received international awards.

She has hosted and participated as a panelist on several television programs. In 2002, she hosted the late-night program  on Mega. She was a panelist on the talk show  in 2004, and later on the show business program .

Political career
Santibáñez actively participated in the presidential candidacy of Marco Enríquez-Ominami in 2009. She later joined the Progressive Party (PRO), which he formed in 2010.

In June 2013, the PRO announced her as a candidate for deputy for District 30 in that November's parliamentary election, as part of the coalition If You Want It, Chile Changes. She received the majority of popular votes, but was not elected because, by the rules of the binomial system which rewards the two highest-voted lists, her list finished third behind those of Nueva Mayoría and the Alliance.

In the 2016 municipal elections, she was the  coalition's candidate for mayor of San Bernardo, receiving 13,079 votes – equivalent to 25.54% – and losing to Independent Democratic Union candidate Nora Cuevas.

She again competed for a seat in the Chamber of Deputies, this time for the new District 14, in the 2017 parliamentary election. She received 35,913 votes – equivalent to 11.9% of the total – and was elected, becoming the PRO's first deputy and its sole representative in the legislative session that began on 11 March 2018.

She is a member of the permanent commissions for culture and the arts, sports and recreation, and citizen security.

Santibáñez was part of the PRO's parliamentary committee until March 2019, when she submitted her resignation to the party, becoming an independent deputy. In September 2019, she joined the PCCh.

References

External links

 
 
  This article incorporates text from the Library of Congress of Chile available under the CC BY 3.0 CL license.

1975 births
21st-century Chilean politicians
21st-century Chilean women politicians
Actresses from Santiago
Chilean actor-politicians
Chilean radio presenters
Chilean women radio presenters
Chilean television actresses
Chilean women television presenters
Communist Party of Chile politicians
Progressive Party (Chile) politicians
Living people
Members of the Chamber of Deputies of Chile
Politicians from Santiago
Women members of the Chamber of Deputies of Chile